The Harz-Heide Road is a road that runs over the Harz mountains in Germany through heath (German: Heide) landscape and which is known for its scenery.

It runs from Göttingen along the B 27 and B 446 federal highways to Duderstadt and Herzberg. From there it continues on the B 27 to Bad Lauterberg and Braunlage. It then follows the B 4 through Bad Harzburg, Vienenburg, Wolfenbüttel, Braunschweig, Gifhorn and Uelzen to the town of Lüneburg.

Literature 
 

German tourist routes
Roads in Lower Saxony
Transport in the Harz